Milan is a 1995 Indian Hindi action romance film directed by Mahesh Bhatt, starring Jackie Shroff and Manisha Koirala.

Plot 
Raja (Jackie Shroff) is a small-time smuggler. His sweetheart, Priya (Manisha Koirala), does not approve of this, and convinces him to give up his smuggling activities, and turn the information over to the police. He does so, only to find that he has been framed for a murder he did not commit. When he decides to entrust himself to the justice of the courts, he is convicted of murder and sentenced to jail. In jail, he encounters more problems, and needs all his wits to stay alive. Back to Priya; Raja's former smuggling colleagues, including corrupt police officers, are openly harassing her, and no one seems to be able to look after her. Raja must get out of jail to find out who has framed him, and who is the king-pin behind the smuggling ring.

Cast

Music
Music was by Anand–Milind. Lyrics were by Sameer. "Ek Baat Bataoon" became very popular.
 "Aanewali Hai Milan Ki" Performed by Abhijeet Bhattacharya
 "Aansu Judai Ke" Performed by Pankaj Udhas, Sadhna Sargam
 "Ek Baat Bataon" Performed by Kumar Sanu, Sadhna Sargam
 "Kahin Toh Milegi" Performed by Abhijeet
 "Aa Jaana Haseen Samaan" Performed by Abhijeet, Kavita Krishnamurthy

References

External links

1995 films
1990s Hindi-language films
Films scored by Anand–Milind
Films directed by Mahesh Bhatt
Indian action drama films
Films with screenplays by Robin Bhatt
Indian romantic action films
1990s action drama films